Hoseynabad-e Sarhang (also Romanized as Ḩoseynābād-e Sarhang; also known as Hosein Abad and Ḩoseynābād) is a village in Rigan Rural District, in the Central District of Rigan County, Kerman Province, Iran. At the 2006 census, its population was 138, in 39 families.

References 

Populated places in Rigan County